is a city located in Mie Prefecture, Japan. , the city had an estimated population of 274,879 in 127,273 households and a population density of 390 persons per km². Although the second largest city in the prefecture in terms of population, its designation as the prefectural capital and its holding of a large concentration of national government offices and educational facilities make the city the administrative and educational center of Mie Prefecture.

Geography
Tsu is located in east-central Kii Peninsula, in central Mie Prefecture. It is the largest city in Mie Prefecture in terms of area and stretches the width of Mie Prefecture, and is bordered by Ise Bay on the Pacific Ocean to the east, and Nara Prefecture to the west. Parts of the city are within the limits of the Murō-Akame-Aoyama Quasi-National Park.

Neighboring municipalities
 The city of Suzuka, to the north
 The city of Kameyama, to the north
 The city of Matsusaka, to the south
 The city of Iga, to the west
 The city of Nabari to the west
 The village of Soni, Nara to the west
 The village of Mitsue, Nara to the west

Climate
Tsu has a Humid subtropical climate (Köppen Cfa) characterized by warm summers and cool winters with light to no snowfall.  The average annual temperature in Tsu is 15.6 °C. The average annual rainfall is 1931 mm with September as the wettest month. The temperatures are highest on average in August, at around 26.7 °C, and lowest in January, at around 5.0 °C. Precipitation is significant throughout the year, but is heaviest from May to September.

Demographics
Per Japanese census data, the population of Tsu has been relatively stable over the past 40 years.

History

Origin

The port was destroyed by a tsunami in the 1498 Meiō Nankaidō earthquake.

Edo Period
The town was rebuilt as a castle town and a post station by the Tōdō clan, daimyō of Tsu Domain under the Tokugawa shogunate. During the Edo period, it became a popular stopping point for travelers to Ise Grand Shrine, about 40 km to the southeast.

Modern Tsu
Following the Meiji Restoration, Tsu became the capital of Mie Prefecture in 1871. With the establishment of then modern municipalities on April 1, 1889, Tsu was one of the original 31 cities to be proclaimed. The city borders gradually expanded, with Tsu annexing the neighboring villages of Tatebe and Tosa in 1909, Shinmachi in 1934, Fujimi in 1936, Takachaya in 1939 and Anto, Kanbe and Kushigata in 1943. During World War II, Allied air raids on July 24 and July 28, 1945, destroyed most of the city and killed 1,239 people. In 1953, Tsu annexed the neighboring villages of Kumozu in 1953, Isshinden, Shiratsuka, Kurima, and Katada in 1954 and Toyosato in 1973.

On January 1, 2006, the neighboring city of Hisai, the towns of Anō, Geinō and Kawage, and the village of Misato (all in Age District), the towns of Hakusan, Ichishi and Karasu, and the village of Misugi (all in Ichishi District) were merged into Tsu. As a result of the merger, the city became the second largest in Mie by population behind Yokkaichi, and the largest in Mie by area ahead of Matsusaka.

Government
Tsu has a mayor-council form of government with a directly elected mayor and a unicameral city council of 34 members. Tsu contributes seven members to the Mie Prefectural Assembly. In terms of national politics, the city is part of Mie 1st district of the lower house of the Diet of Japan.

Economy

Imuraya Confectionery, a confectionery company, and ZTV, a cable television operator, are headquartered in Tsu.

Education

Colleges and universities
Mie University, the prefecture's only national university.
Tsu City College
Mie Prefectural College of Nursing
Takada Junior College

Primary and secondary education
Tsu has 48 public elementary schools and 19 public middle schools operated by the city government, one public elementary school and one public middle schools affiliated with Mie University and two private middle schools. The city has nine public operated by the Mie Prefectural Board of Education and three private high schools
The prefecture also operates six special education schools for the disabled.

Transportation

Railway
 JR Tōkai – Kisei Main Line
 -  -  - 
 JR Tōkai –Meishō Line
 -  -  -  –  -  -  -  -  -  -  - 
 Kintetsu Railway -Nagoya Line
  -  -  -  -  -  -  -  -  - 
 Kintetsu Railway -Osaka Line
  -  -  -  - 
Ise Railway - Ise Railway Ise Line
  –  –  -

Highway

Expressway
 Ise Expressway

Japan National Route
 
 
 
 
 
 
 
 ]

Sea Ports
Port of Tsu-Matsusaka

Sister city relations
 – Higashishirakawa, Gifu, since June 28, 1989
 – Osasco, São Paulo, Brazil, since October 18, 1976
 – Zhenjiang, Jiangsu, China – since June 11, 1984

Local attractions 
Tsu is famous for its , a festival commemorating the arrival of the Joseon Tongsinsa delegation from Korea during the feudal period. There are two other cities that celebrate Tōjin Odori: Suzuka city in Mie Prefecture and Ushimado-chō in Okayama Prefecture.

The ruins of Tsu Castle have been made into a downtown city park.

Kitabatake Shrine and Yūki Shrine are notable local Shinto shrines.

Culture

Sports

Baseball
Mie Takatora baseball club（JABA）

Volleyball
Veertien Mie（V.League）

Notable people

Sho Gokyu, professional soccer player
Mika Hagi, 2007 Miss Japan
Mu Kanazaki, professional soccer player
Kōji Kitao, sumo wrestler
Kotokaze Kōki, sumo wrestler
Ayumi Oka, actress
Hiroshi Okuda, former president of Toyota Motors
Edogawa Rampo, author
Kōdō Sawaki, Zen Buddhist
Chikara Sakaguchi, politician
Yuki Hashimoto, politician, former idol
Hidesaburō Ueno, agricultural scientist 
Saori Yoshida, Olympic wrestler
Yoshihito Nishioka, professional tennis player

References

External links

  
 

 
Cities in Mie Prefecture
Populated coastal places in Japan
Port settlements in Japan